Jiha Moon (born 1973) is a contemporary artist who focuses on painting, printmaking, and sculptural ceramic objects. Born in Daegu, South Korea, Moon is currently based in Atlanta, Georgia.

Early life and education
Moon was born in Daegu, South Korea in 1973. After earning her Bachelor of Fine Arts from Korea University and her Master of Fine Arts in Western Painting from Ewha Womans University. After graduating, Moon relocated to the United States to pursue a Master of Fine Arts in painting at the University of Iowa.

Work

Moon's paintings combine visual icons and symbols from a variety of sources, cutting across culture lines to the accumulation of art historical, corporate, and advertising symbols in contemporary society. Eastern and Western imagery and painting techniques, emoji, internet icons, and folk art are present in her work. She works primarily in acrylic paint on Hanji, a Korean paper, and incorporates fabrics, embroidery, and print collage in her paintings.

After she completes the abstract version of the composition she re-configures some of the markings to suggest recognizable images, such as cartoon characters. She also incorporates mass-produced items like textiles, embroidered patches, small trinkets.

Art critic Roberta Smith wrote about Moon's work in the 2005 Asia Society exhibition "One Way or Another: Asian American Art Now," stating, "Jiha Moon packs...information into large, teeming paintings on paper, creating a sense of flux... rife with references to everything from traditional Chinese brush painting to contemporary cartoons."

She has received a number of awards including the Joan Mitchell Foundation Painters and Sculptors Grant, the Trawick Prize, and a Museum of Contemporary Art of Georgia Working Artist grant. Moon has been an artist in residence at the Headlands Center for the Arts, the Omi International Arts Center, MacDowell Colony, the Fabric Workshop and Museum, and the Henry Luce III Center for the Arts and Religion.

Her work, Yellowave (black) 1, was acquired by the Smithsonian American Art Museum as part of the Renwick Gallery's 50th Anniversary Campaign.

Exhibitions 

Moon's solo exhibition "Double Welcome: Most Everyone's Mad Here," which was organized by the Taubman Museum of Art and Halsey Institute of Contemporary Art, opened at the Taubman Museum of Art in Roanoke, VA, in 2015 has or will continue to travel to the  Halsey Institute of Contemporary Art], the Kalamazoo Institute of Arts, the Salina Art Center, the Jule Collins Smith Museum of Fine Art, the Richard E. Peeler Art Center at DePauw University, the Tarble Arts Center at Eastern Illinois University, the American University Museum, and Crisp-Ellert Art Museum at Flagler College. Moon has also had solo exhibitions at the Mint Museum in Charlotte, NC, the Cheekwood Botanical Garden and Museum of Art in Nashville, TN,  the James Gallery at the CUNY Graduate Center in New York City, and the Weatherspoon Art Museum in Greensboro, NC, as well as galleries in Atlanta, New York, Seoul, Washington D.C., and Zurich.

Collections 

Asheville Art Museum
Asia Society Singapore Tyler Print Institute  
The Fabric Workshop and Museum  
High Museum 
Hirshhorn Museum and Sculpture Garden  
Mint Museum 
Museum of Contemporary Art of Georgia
National Museum of Women in the Arts
Virginia Museum of Fine Arts

Bibliography 
2016:
Hawley, Anthony. "Future Fossil, Other Vessel".  Brooklyn Rail, June 3, 2016.

2014:
Colvin, Rob. "In Survey of Southern Art, Place is the Space". Hyperallergic, September 5, 2014.
Yau, John. "Postscript to the Whitney Biennial: an Asian-American Perspective". Hyperallergic, June 29, 2014.
Yau, John. "Kathy Butterfly and the Aesthetic Challenge of "No Two Alike"". Hyperallergic, March 16, 2014. 

2012:
Kim, Micki Wick. "Jiha Moon". Korean Contemporary Art. Prestel Publishing: Munich, London, New York. Pg. 138-141. 2012.

2010:
Cochran, Rebecca Dimling. "Critics' Pick: Jiha Moon". ARTFORUM.com, Feb 2010.

2008:
McClintock, Diana. "Jiha Moon". Art Papers, Mar/Apr 2008.
Cochran, Rebecca Dimling. "Jiha Moon". Art in America, May 2008.

2007:
Cohen, David. "Weather Channels". The New York Sun, May 17, 2007.
Oppenheim, Phil. "Talent Show, Atlanta". Art Papers, Sept/Oct 2007.
 Capps, Kriston. "Line Tripping." Washington City Paper, Oct 5, 2007.
Wennerstrom, Nord. "Jiha Moon at Curator's Office". ARTFORUM, Dec 2007.

2006:
New American Paintings. Open Press, #63 Mid Atlantic Regions. Boston, MA 2006.
McClintock, Diana. "Red Beans and Rice". Art Papers, Jan/Feb 2006.
Howell, George. "Jiha Moon". Art Papers, Jan/Feb 2006.
Smith, Roberta. "A Mélange of Asian Roots and Shifting Identities". The New York Times, Sept 8, 2006.
Kunitz, Daniel. "Defying the Definitive". New York Sun, Sept 14, 2006. 
Yang, Jeff. "ASIAN POP/ Art Breakers". San Francisco Chronicle, Oct 16, 2006. 

2005:
Cudlin, Jeffry. "Digital Distortion". Washington City Paper, Dec 30 2005 - Jan 5 2006.
O'Sullivan, Michael. "Jiha Moon's Shining Contrasts". The Washington Post, Sept 16, 2005.
Dawson, Jessica. "Jiha Moon's Fantasy Islands". The Washington Post, Sept 15, 2005.

2004:
Johnson, Ken. "'Semi Lucid,' White Columns". The New York Times, Oct 8, 2004.

References

External links 
 Official website
 Curator's Office
 interview with Jiha Moon at the Fabric Workshop and Museum
 Landfall Press

1973 births
South Korean contemporary artists
South Korean painters
Ewha Womans University alumni
Korea University alumni
University of Iowa alumni
South Korean emigrants to the United States
Living people
Artists from Atlanta
South Korean women artists